The 2022 MotoE World Cup (known officially as the 2022 FIM Enel MotoE World Cup for sponsorship reasons) was the fourth season of the MotoE World Cup for electric motorcycle racing, and was part of the 74th F.I.M. Grand Prix motorcycle racing season.

This was the last season of Energica being the sole supplier of the World Cup as they withdrew from the Cup after the season, with Ducati expected to take their place as the new sole manufacturer starting 2023.

Dominique Aegerter clinched the championship after a crash from Eric Granado during race 1 in Misano, his first MotoE crown.

Teams and riders 
All teams use the series-specified Energica Ego Corsa.

Rider changes
 Mattia Casadei joined HP Pons 40, replacing Jasper Iwema.
 Eric Granado joined LCR E-Team, replacing Kevin Zannoni.
He rejoined Tech3 E-Racing, the team he raced with during the 2019 MotoE season.

Mid-season changes
 Bradley Smith missed the opening three rounds after suffering a fractured vertebra during the 24 Hours of Le Mans. He was replaced by Lukas Tulovic for the Spanish round, while Andrea Mantovani replaced him for the French and Italian rounds.
 Xavier Cardelús missed the opening Spanish round due to injury sustained from a training accident. He was replaced by Yeray Ruiz. Cardelús also missed the Dutch round after having surgery on a ruptured tendon sustained during the previous Italian round. He was replaced by Unai Orradre.
 Jordi Torres missed the Italian round due to a fractured fibula sustained during race 1 of the previous French round. He was replaced by Massimo Roccoli.

Regulation changes
Starting this season, standard MotoE events featured two Free Practice sessions, a Qualifying on Friday, and two races: one on Saturday and the other on Sunday.

E-Pole was replaced by more traditional Qualifying sessions: Qualifying session format: Q1 (10 minutes) – 10 min break – Q2 (10 minutes).

Calendar 
The following Grands Prix took place in 2022:

Grand Prix locations

Calendar changes 

 The Finnish Grand Prix scheduled for July was cancelled in May due to incomplete homologation works and the risks associated with the geopolitical situation in the region.
 The Austrian Grand Prix used a new layout of the Red Bull Ring, wherein a chicane was added to the previous fast slight-left hander of turn 2. This was done to improve the overall safety of the track by greatly minimizing the speed the riders take the turn. The final configuration was chosen among 15 proposals, with the track being 30 meters longer than the previous configurations.

Results and standings

Grands Prix

Cup standings
Scoring system
Points were awarded to the top fifteen finishers. A rider had to finish the race to earn points. 

  – Half points were awarded during race 2 of the Dutch TT as less than two-thirds of the scheduled race distance (but at least three full laps) was completed.

Notes

References 

Grand Prix motorcycle racing seasons